Gavril Dejeu (born 11 September 1932) is a Romanian politician who served as Minister of Interior in Victor Ciorbea's cabinet. He was also acting (or ad interim) Prime Minister of Romania from 30 March to 17 April 1998.

Born in Poieni, Cluj County, Kingdom of Romania, he graduated from Babeș-Bolyai University (UBB) in Law. Dejeu subsequently joined the Christian Democratic National Peasants' Party (PNŢCD) in 1989, in the wake of the Romanian Revolution, serving in the Chamber of Deputies from 1992 to 2000. He and his wife Elena have one daughter, Flavia Vlad.

He is one of the few former MPs and former high ranking political office holders in Romania who gave up his special pension.

References 

 Gavril DEJEU Sinteza activitatii parlamentare în legislatura 1996–2000

1932 births
Living people
Christian Democratic National Peasants' Party politicians
People from Cluj County
Prime Ministers of Romania
Romanian Ministers of Interior